Vorobyovsky/Vorobyevsky (masculine), Vorobyovskaya/Vorobyevskaya (feminine), or Vorobyovskoye/Vorobyevskoye (neuter) is the name of several rural localities in Russia:
Vorobyevsky, Astrakhan Oblast, a settlement in Zabuzansky Selsoviet of Krasnoyarsky District of Astrakhan Oblast
Vorobyevsky, Novosibirsk Oblast, a settlement in Novosibirsky District of Novosibirsk Oblast
Vorobyevskaya, a village in Oshevensky Selsoviet of Kargopolsky District of Arkhangelsk Oblast